The Cajun Classic Open Invitational was a golf tournament in Louisiana on the PGA Tour in the late 1950s and 1960s, played at the Oakbourne Country Club in Lafayette, usually in late November. It debuted as the Lafayette Open Invitational in 1958, and in many years was the last tournament on the PGA Tour schedule, which attracted players fighting for position on the money list. 

John Barnum, the only man in the history of the PGA Tour to earn his first win after age 50, won this event in 1962  Barnum was also the first player to win on Tour using a Ping putter.

The 1963 tournament began on Thursday, November 21, but during the second round the following day, news of the assassination of President John F. Kennedy swept the course. Saturday's play was postponed in deference to the news, with the tournament finishing on Sunday with the final two rounds being played. 

It lost the last tournament slot on the 1969 schedule and the resulting smaller field caused monetary problems that resulted in the tournament folding.

Winners

References

External links
Oakbourne Country Club

Former PGA Tour events
Recurring sporting events established in 1958
Recurring sporting events disestablished in 1968
Golf in Louisiana
Sports in Lafayette, Louisiana
1958 establishments in Louisiana
1968 disestablishments in Louisiana